Agh Zaman Kandi (also Romanized as Āgh Zamān Kandī; also known as Āq Zamān Golī and Āq Zamān Kandī) is a village in Dowlatabad Rural District, in the Central District of Namin County, Ardabil Province, Iran. At the 2006 census, its population was 96, in 23 families.

References 

Towns and villages in Namin County